Oru Malarin Payanam is a 1985 Indian Tamil-language film, directed by Muktha Srinivasan. The film stars Lakshmi, Murali, Urvashi and Sulakshana. It is based on the novel of the same name by Anuradha Ramanan. The film was released on 7 June 1985.

Plot

Cast 

Lakshmi
Murali
Urvashi
Sulakshana
Moulee
Manorama
Arundathi
A. Sakuntala
Vijaya Chandrika
Janagaraj
Idichapuli Selvaraj
Usilaimani
Veeraraghavan
Kathadi Ramamurthy
Oru Viral Krishna Rao
Ramji
G.K
Nagaraja Cholan
Vairam Krishnamoorthy
A. Soorya Kala
R. Jaya Chandira
M. R. Sulochana
Devi Chandira

Soundtrack 
The soundtrack was composed by Chandrabose.

Reception
Jayamanmadhan of Kalki praised the performances of Lakshmi, Sulakshana and Chandrabose's music but felt Vietnam Veedu Sundaram's dialogues could have been tighter.

References

External links 
 

1985 films
1980s Tamil-language films
Films based on Indian novels
Films directed by Muktha Srinivasan
Films scored by Chandrabose (composer)